"Tiger" is a 1959 song by Fabian Forte, written by Ollie Jones.  It was Fabian's most successful single, reaching #3 on the U.S. Billboard, Hot 100 charts.  "Tiger" was Fabian's only entry on the US, Billboard, Hot R&B Sides chart, where it reached #15.

References

1959 singles
1959 songs
Chancellor Records singles
Songs written by Ollie Jones (songwriter)